Cleghorne! is an American sitcom television series starring comedian Ellen Cleghorne that aired on The WB from September 10 to December 17, 1995. Garrett Morris and Alaina Reed Hall costarred as Ellen's character's parents, Sidney and Lena, with Steve Bean, Cerita Monet Bickelmann, Michael Ralph and Sherri Shepherd.

Among the first batch of original programming ordered by the newly launched WB network, the series was put on hiatus after 12 episodes in December 1995. The show was later cancelled with three episodes left unaired.

Synopsis
The series focuses on the life of Ellen Carlson (Cleghorne), a single mom who is raising her nine-year-old daughter Akeyla on Manhattan's Upper West Side. Comedic situations arise as Ellen tries to balance raising her daughter, running a local production company in SoHo, and the interference her overbearing parents, Sidney and Lena, who live next door.

Cast

Main

 Ellen Cleghorne as Ellen Carlson, a single mother who runs a struggling television commercial production company
 Garrett Morris as Sidney Carlson, Ellen's father, a U.S. Post Office letter carrier and part-time building doorman 
 Alaina Reed Hall as Lena Carlson, Ellen's mother, a part-time schoolteacher
 Steve Bean as Brad, Ellen's partner
 Cerita Monet Bickelmann as Akeyla Carlson, Ellen's daughter
 Michael Ralph as Tyrell Livingston, Ellen's ex-husband
 Sherri Shepherd as Victoria Carlson, Ellen's dim-witted sister who aspires to become a model

Recurring
 Cathy Silvers as Coral, a waitress at Piccolo's, the local bar
 Dorien Wilson as Jeff, a man Ellen dates who is the father of George, a student at Akeyla's private school

Development
Cleghorne was the third black woman to be credited on Saturday Night Live (1991–1995), after Yvonne Hudson and Danitra Vance, and the first woman of color to appear on the series as a full-fledged cast member for longer than a single season. She left to focus on her starring role in her own sitcom, Cleghorne!. In 1995, Cleghorne! was among the first batch of original programming ordered by the newly launched WB network, then run by former Fox executives who had worked on shows like In Living Color, in which Cleghorne had also appeared. The sitcom was also the first time two Saturday Night Live cast members of color (Cleghorne and original SNL cast member Morris) had worked together on a show after appearing on SNL. The series was also the first television acting job for Shepherd, who would later appear again with Morris on another WB sitcom The Jamie Foxx Show, and would eventually be known for her roles in the sitcoms Less Than Perfect and 30 Rock, and as co-host of the ABC talk show The View.

Episodes

Broadcast
Cleghorne! debuted on The WB on September 10, 1995, but was put on hiatus in December 1995 having aired 12 episodes. The show was later cancelled with three episodes left unaired. Cleghorne later said, "I don't think I was ready. In terms of being strong and saying, 'I can write, this is what I do,' and feel confident in that. And to be able to say, 'No, this does not work, this works better.'"

Reception
On review aggregator Rotten Tomatoes, Cleghorne! has an approval ratings of 40% based on 5 reviews, with an average score of 0.85/10. Slate called Cleghorne! "part of a chapter in television history, a rare moment when black audience demographics were taken seriously by networks and advertisers. Aside from the 1970s, this period [in the 1990s] featured one of the highest concentrations of black scripted programming ever."

References

External links
 
 
 

1995 American television series debuts
1995 American television series endings
1990s American black sitcoms
1990s American sitcoms
English-language television shows
Television series by 20th Century Fox Television
Television shows set in New York City
The WB original programming